Barabbas was, according to the New Testament, a prisoner who was chosen over Jesus by the crowd in Jerusalem to be pardoned and released by Roman governor Pontius Pilate at the Passover feast.

Biblical account
In one such instance, the "crowd" (ὄχλος : óchlos), "the Jews" and "the multitude" in some sources, are offered the choice to have either Barabbas or Jesus released from Roman custody. According to the Synoptic Gospels of Matthew,Mark, and Luke, and the account in John, the crowd chooses Barabbas to be released and Jesus of Nazareth to be crucified. Pilate reluctantly yields to the insistence of the crowd. One passage, found in the Gospel of Matthew, has the crowd saying (of Jesus), "Let his blood be upon us and upon our children."

Matthew refers to Barabbas only as a "notorious prisoner". Mark and Luke further refer to Barabbas as one involved in a στάσις (stásis, a riot), probably "one of the numerous insurrections against the Roman power" who had committed murder. Robert Eisenman states that John 18:40 refers to Barabbas as a λῃστής (lēstēs, "bandit"), "the word Josephus always employs when talking about Revolutionaries".

Later copies of Luke contain a corresponding verse, although this is not present in the earliest manuscripts, and may be a later gloss to bring Luke into conformity.

The custom of releasing prisoners in Jerusalem at Passover is known to theologians as the Paschal Pardon, but this custom (whether at Passover or any other time) is not recorded in any historical document other than the gospels, leading some scholars to question its historicity and make further claims that such a custom was a mere narrative invention of the Bible's writers.

Name

There exist several versions of this figure's name in gospel manuscripts, most commonly simply  without a first name. However the variations found in different manuscripts of the Matthew 27:16–17 give this figure the first name "Jesus", making his full name "Jesus Barabbas" or "Jesus Bar-rabban", and giving him the same first, given name as Jesus. The Codex Koridethi seems to emphasise Bar-rabban as composed of two elements in line with a patronymic Aramaic name. These versions, featuring the first name "Jesus" are considered original by a number of modern scholars. The Church Father Origen seems to refer to this passage of Matthew in claiming that it must be a corruption, as no sinful man ever bore the name "Jesus" and argues for its exclusion from the text. He however does not account for the high priest  from 2 Maccabees 4:13, whose name seems to transliterate the same Aramaic name into Greek, as well as other bearers of the name Jesus mentioned by Josephus. It is possible that scribes when copying the passage, driven by a reasoning similar to that of Origen, removed this first name "Jesus" from the text to avoid dishonor to the name of the Jesus whom they considered the Messiah.

Etymology 
Of the two larger categories in which transmitted versions of this name fall , seems to represent Jewish Palestinian Aramaic: בּר רַבָּן, romanized: Bar Rabbān, lit. 'Son of our Rabbi/Master', while  appears to derive ultimately from Jewish Palestinian Aramaic: בּר אַבָּא , romanized: Bar ʾAbbā lit. 'Son of ʾAbbā/[the] father''', a patronymic Aramaic name. However, ʾAbbā has been found as a personal name in a 1st-century burial at Giv'at ha-Mivtar. Additionally it appears fairly often as a personal name in the Gemara section of the Talmud, a Jewish text dating from AD 200–400.

Historicity
According to Max Dimont, the story of Barabbas as related in the gospels lacks credibility from both the Roman and Jewish standpoint. The story, on its face, presents the Roman authority, Pontius Pilate, backed by overwhelming military might, being cowed by a small crowd of unarmed civilians into releasing a prisoner condemned to death for insurrection against the Roman Empire. Raymond E. Brown argued that the Gospels' narratives about Barabbas cannot be considered historical, but that it is probable that a prisoner referred to as Barabbas (bar abba, "son of the father") was indeed freed around the period Jesus was crucified and this gave birth to the story. 

On the other hand, Craig A. Evans and N. T. Wright argue in favor of the historicity of the Passover pardon narrative, quoting evidence of such pardons from Livy's Books from the Foundation of the City, Josephus's Antiquities of the Jews, Papyrus Florence, Pliny the Younger's Epistles and the Mishnah.

The similarities of the name in some manuscripts and the name of Jesus have led some modern scholars to argue that the counter-intuitive similarity of the two men's names is evidence of its historicity. They doubt a Christian writer would invent a similar name for a criminal, practically equating Christ with a criminal, if he were fictionalizing the story for a polemical or theological purpose.

A minority of scholars, including Benjamin Urrutia, Stevan Davies, Hyam Maccoby and Horace Abram Rigg, have contended that Barabbas and Jesus were the same person.

Antisemitism

The story of Barabbas has played a role in historical antisemitism because it has historically been used to lay the blame for the crucifixion of Jesus on the Jews, and thereby to justify antisemitism – an interpretation known as Jewish deicide. Pope Benedict XVI, in his 2011 book Jesus of Nazareth, dismisses this reading, since the Greek word "ὄχλος : óchlos" in Mark means "crowd", rather than "Jewish people" but most scholars consider that the population of Judea at the time was mostly of Jewish origin.

 Art, literature, and media 
Barabas is the main character in The Jew of Malta, a 16th-century play by Christopher Marlowe.
The Russian novelist Mikhail Bulgakov, in his fictional portrayal of the crucifixion in the novel The Master and Margarita (c. 1940), creates a more compelling portrait of Pilate as a harassed and despondent provincial official. He imagines a conversation between Pilate and Caiaphas, the high priest of the Jerusalem temple, where the latter threatens Pilate that Jesus of Nazareth will inspire an uprising in Jerusalem if he is released. Pilate; bitter, frustrated, fatigued by a command that does not suit him, and ultimately dismissive of Jesus's naïve utopianism, accepts to carry out the death sentence rather than worsen the ill will of the local priesthood.
 In Spanish, barrabás is a colloquial word for a bad or naughty person, while barrabasada is a bad decision. The word baraba has a similar meaning (vagabond, raff) in Slavic languages, especially Serbian and Croatian.
 In The Liars' Gospel, a 2012 novel by Naomi Alderman, Barabbas is one of the protagonists and Alderman depicts Barabbas rather than Jesus as the man who summons fishermen.
 The Belgian comics character Professor Barabas is named after the biblical character.
 Barabbas is the namesake of the Ultraman Ace kaiju Baraba, who plays a key role in a two-part episode as one of Yapool's pawns in a scheme that results in the crucifixion of the four previous Ultramen.
 Fulton Oursler, in his 1949 novel, The Greatest Story Ever Told, portrays Barabbas as a friend of Saint Joseph, who was the husband of Mary and the legal father of Jesus. Joseph's friend, originally known as Samuel, is a member of a group dedicated to the overthrow of Roman rule. Samuel, acquainted with the story of Jesus' birth, tells Joseph that he is choosing the name "Jesus Barabbas".

 The 1961 film Barabbas, based on the novel by Pär Lagerkvist, depicts the life of the biblical figure, portrayed by Anthony Quinn, following the Crucifixion as he seeks salvation.
Metro-Goldwyn-Mayer's 1961 film King of Kings works out a fictionalized backstory of Barabbas' arrest, depicting him as a Zealot and a partner in crime of Judas Iscariot who incites and fails in a revolt to overwhelm Jerusalem's Roman garrison.Give Us Barabbas! was a 1961 TV film produced for the Hallmark Hall of Fame, written by Henry Denker and directed by George Schaefer. Barabbas was portrayed by James Daly. The film also starred Kim Hunter, Dennis King, Keir Dullea and Toni Darnay.
 From  27 March – 24 April 1977, NBC-TV presented the miniseries Jesus of Nazareth. Actor Stacy Keach portrayed Barabbas.Barabbas, a 2005 TV film by Indian director Aneesh Daniel focuses on the imprisonment and subsequent release (in place of Jesus) of Barabbas.
 The controversial speculative history The Holy Blood and the Holy Grail, which posits a bloodline descended from Jesus and which served as source material for Dan Brown's novel The Da Vinci Code, advances the theory that Jesus Barabbas was the son of Jesus (and that the use of "Barabbas", meaning "son of the Rabbi" or "son of the father", was akin to "Junior").  The theory runs that the son was more violent than his father in efforts to overthrow Roman rule and to restore power to his Jewish royal family.  It further proposes that Barabbas's release by Pilate was given in return for the surrender of Jesus, who had himself turned over to Roman authorities as a trade, to secure his son's release and banishment rather than execution, thus to preserve the Jewish royal line in his son by his own self-sacrifice.  This release of the Jewish heir apparent, in exchange for the execution of his father, the claimant Jesus, King of the Jews, so the theory expounds, was done to appease the Jewish population and prevent an uprising.
 The 2016 film Risen'' depicts Barabbas as the leader of a Zealot revolt, in which the protagonist Clavius Aquila Valerius Niger leads soldiers to crush the revolt, and who eventually executes the defeated Barabbas on the field of battle.

See also 
 Biblical criticism
 Historicity of Jesus
 Textual criticism

References

Notes

Citations

Sources

 

 
People in the canonical gospels
Pontius Pilate
Gospel of Mark
Gospel of Matthew
Gospel of Luke
Gospel of John
Prisoners and detainees
Biblical murderers